Miloslav Buzek (25 November 1899 – 19 April 1940) was a Czech equestrian. He competed in two events at the 1936 Summer Olympics.

References

External links
 

1899 births
1940 deaths
Czech male equestrians
Olympic equestrians of Czechoslovakia
Equestrians at the 1936 Summer Olympics
Place of birth missing